Shadid may refer to:

Shadid (‘Ad's son), a son of ‘Ad in Arabian belief
Anthony Shadid (1968–2012), Lebanese-American journalist
George Shadid (1929-2018), American politician
James E. Shadid (born 1957), American judge
Michael Shadid (1882–1966), Lebanese physician 
Abdelrahman shadid (2003- ),Egyptian medical student